Osteocephalus fuscifacies is a species of frog in the family Hylidae endemic to Ecuador. It is known from the Napo River drainage at intermediate elevations ( asl). The specific name fuscifacies is derived from Latin fuscus (=tan) and facies (=face), in reference to the uniform tan-colored loreal region and the lack of a light subocular spot. Common name Napo slender-legged treefrog has been coined for this species.

Description
Male Osteocephalus fuscifacies measure  and females  in snout–vent length. The fingers and the toes are partially webbed. The Dorsum has tan ground color, often with irregular darker tan transverse bars or blotches. The limbs are barred. The venter is light tan with creamy white granules, or completelycreamy white. The throat has some tan spots, sometimes only few and inconspicuous.

Behavior and reproduction 
Osteocephalus fuscifacies are nocturnal frogs. Apparently, the eggs are laid in bromeliads and these frogs seldon descent to the ground. The arboreal lifestyle of this species makes it difficult to observe.

Habitat and conservation
It is threatened by habitat loss caused by agricultural development and logging. It occurs in the Sumaco Napo-Galeras and Yasuni National Parks.

References

fuscifacies
Amphibians of Ecuador
Endemic fauna of Ecuador
Amphibians described in 2000
Taxonomy articles created by Polbot